Mistassini is a former town, now part of the city of Dolbeau-Mistassini in the Canadian province of Quebec.

Mistassini may also refer to:

 Mistassini River
 Mistassini Lake

See also
 Mistissini, a First Nations reserve